Caraiman may refer to several places in Romania:

 Caraiman Peak, in the Bucegi Mountains
 Caraiman, a village in Mihălășeni Commune, Botoșani County
 Caraiman, a village in Brabova Commune, Dolj County

and to:

 Caraiman, a village in Frasin Commune, Dondușeni district, Moldova